Jonhes Elias Pinto dos Santos, shortly Jonhes (born September 28, 1979 in Goiânia) is a Brazilian footballer.

His prior clubs include Brasiliense, Gama, Ceilândia, CFZ de Brasília, Bandeirante and Pohang Steelers. Jonhes has played for Ceilândia Esporte Clube and Brasiliense Futebol Clube in the Copa do Brasil.

Honors
 Campeonato Brasiliense in 2002 with CFZ de Brasília
 Campeonato Brasiliense in 2006, 2007 with Brasiliense
 K-League champion in 2007 with Pohang Steelers

References

Jonhes Elias Pinto dos Santos at Kirin Soccer
Profile at sport365.ro

External links

1979 births
Brazilian footballers
Brazilian expatriate footballers
Association football forwards
Living people
União Bandeirante Futebol Clube players
Sociedade Esportiva do Gama players
Brasiliense Futebol Clube players
Pohang Steelers players
K League 1 players
Expatriate footballers in South Korea
Tianjin Jinmen Tiger F.C. players
Chinese Super League players
Expatriate footballers in China
CSM Unirea Alba Iulia players
Expatriate footballers in Romania
Brazilian expatriate sportspeople in South Korea
Brazilian expatriate sportspeople in China
Ceilândia Esporte Clube players
Sportspeople from Goiânia